The Ambassador of the United Kingdom to Liberia is the United Kingdom's foremost diplomatic representative in the Republic of Liberia.

Liberia has been an independent state since 1847, but until 1946 the UK mission was only at the level of Consul or Consul-General. From 1991 to 2003 the British Ambassador to Ivory Coast was non-resident ambassador to Liberia, and from 2003 to 2013 the British High Commissioner to Sierra Leone was non-resident ambassador. From 2013 the UK again has a resident ambassador at Monrovia.

List of Heads of Mission

Consuls
1847
1902–1905: Capt Charles Francis Cromie, for Republic of Liberia, and for French Western Africa

Envoy Extraordinary and Minister Plenipotentiary
1946–1949: John Bowering
1949–1951: John Baillie
1951–1952: Charles Capper

Ambassador Extraordinary and Plenipotentiary
1952–1957: Charles Capper
1957–1960: Guy Clarke
1960–1963: Harold Brown
1963–1967: Malcolm Walker
1967–1970: John Curle
1970–1973: Martin Moynihan
1973–1978: John Reiss
1978–1980: John Gordon Doubleday
1980–1985: Dougal Reid
1985–1987: Alec Ibbott
1988–1990: Michael Gore
1990–1997: Margaret Rothwell (non-resident)
1997–2001: Haydon Warren-Gash (non-resident)
2001–2003: Francois Gordon (non-resident)
2003–2006: John Mitchiner (non-resident)
2006–2008: Sarah MacIntosh (non-resident)
2009–2013: Ian Hughes (non-resident)
2013–2015: Fergus Cochrane-Dyet

2015–2020 David Belgrove
2020–present: Neil Bradley

References

External links
UK and Liberia – gov.uk

Liberia
United Kingdom
United Kingdom Ambassador